General Sir Walter Stewart Leslie KCB, KBE, CMG, DSO (23 March 1876 – 9 August 1947) was a Scottish officer who served in the British Indian Army.

Early life and education
Leslie was born in Edinburgh, the third son of Lieutenant-Colonel Archibald Young Leslie, of Kininvie House, Banffshire, and Alice Louisa Cautley. He was educated at the Royal Military College, Sandhurst.

Military career
Leslie was commissioned into the Royal West Kent Regiment in February 1896 and took part in the Siege of Malakand in July 1897 before transferring to the Indian army and the 40th Pathans in September 1898 and then again to the 31st Punjabis in December 1900. He served in World War I and then subsequently in the Third Anglo-Afghan War in 1919. He commanded a column in operations against the Waziris in 1920 and then became Director of Military Operations at Army Headquarters, India in 1923. He went on to be Deputy Adjutant-General and Director of Personal Services in India in 1924, Deputy Quartermaster General in India in 1927 and Commander of Lahore District in 1928. His last appointment was as Adjutant-General, India in 1932 before retiring in 1936.

In retirement, Leslie became colonel of the 2nd battalion the 16th Punjab Regiment.

References

1876 births
1947 deaths
Military personnel from Edinburgh
Graduates of the Royal Military College, Sandhurst
Knights Commander of the Order of the Bath
Knights Commander of the Order of the British Empire
Companions of the Order of St Michael and St George
Companions of the Distinguished Service Order
British Indian Army generals
Indian Army generals of World War I
British military personnel of the Third Anglo-Afghan War
Queen's Own Royal West Kent Regiment officers
British people in colonial India